James E. Newland (March 1830 – 12 May 1907) was a United States Republican politician.  He served as a member of the South Dakota State Senate in 1893.

References 
 South Dakota Legislature – Legislator Historical Listing

1830 births
1907 deaths
Republican Party South Dakota state senators
19th-century American politicians